Hydatina albocincta, common name the white-banded bubble, is a species of sea snail or bubble snail, a marine opisthobranch gastropod mollusk in the family Aplustridae.

References

 Powell A. W. B., New Zealand Mollusca, William Collins Publishers Ltd, Auckland, New Zealand 1979 

Aplustridae
Gastropods described in 1839